Fire Ice is the third book in the NUMA Files series of books co-written by best-selling author Clive Cussler and Paul Kemprecos, and was published in 2002. The main character of this series is Kurt Austin.

Plot 
In this novel, a Russian businessman with Tsarist ambitions masterminds a plot against America, which involves triggering a set of earthquakes on the ocean floor, creating a number of tsunami to hit the USA coastline.  It is up to Kurt and his team, and some new allies, to stop his plans. The businessman's first move is to hijack a US Navy research submarine, the NR-1. The crew are captured and beaten up by neo-Cossacks. Then they are rescued by Kurt and his team, minus the captain and pilot.

References

2002 American novels
The NUMA Files
G. P. Putnam's Sons books
Collaborative novels